The 2020–21 Nigeria Professional Football League (NPFL) was the 50th season of the top flight league in the Nigeria football league system and the 31st since its rebranding. The league started on 27 December 2020 after much delay and concluded on 5 August 2021.

Enyimba were the defending champions from the 2019 season but failed to defend their title after finishing third on the table.

The season was initially scheduled to commence on 6 December 2020 but after much delay, the League Management Company announced that the league would start on 27 December 2020 with all matches played behind closed doors.

This season featured the 20 teams from the 2019–20 season as no clubs were promoted nor relegated as the season was cancelled due to the COVID-19 pandemic

The League Management Company announced that only 13 stadiums across the country were eligible to host league matches as part of a broader club licensing regime, they were certified to have met minimum requirements to host games. Another 11 were recommended for varying degrees of upgrade and repair works before they can be certified

This season saw a return of live NPFL matches. Selected matches were viewed live on     NPFL TV and on NTA.

On 1 August 2021, Akwa United won their first NPFL title after a convincing 5–2 home win over MFM with    a game left. Akwa United also set a league record with their 18-match unbeaten run, surpassing Enyimba in 2005 and Kano Pillars 2019–20 13-match unbeaten sequence.

Warri Wolves, Jigawa Golden Stars, Ifeanyiubah and Adamawa United were all confirmed relegated at the end of the campaign.

Nasarawa's Silas Nwankwo won the Eunisell golden boot award as the league topscorer for scoring lesser penalties having been tied with Akwa United's Charles Atshimene.

Teams information

Clubs 
The league consisted of 20 teams from the previous season.

Managerial changes

Summary

League table

Results

Positions by round

Statistics

Scoring

Top scorers

Hattricks 

Notes
(H) – Home team

Top assists 
Updated to match(es) played on 11 April 2021

Clean sheets

Awards

Monthly awards

Season's award 
Eunisell golden boot
The golden boot award was won by Nasarawa's Silas Nwankwo. He won having scored lesser penalties than Akwa United's Charles Atshimene as they were tied at 19 goals.

References

External links 
 Nigeria 2020/21 RSSSF

Nigeria Professional Football League seasons
2020–21 in Nigerian football
Nigeria